Kenmore East High School  (nicknamed Ken-East; also Kenmore East Senior High School) is a high school in the Town of Tonawanda, New York.  Its name refers to the Village of Kenmore in New York.  The school's mascot is a bulldog. The school was founded in 1959, and is the sister school to Kenmore West Senior High School.

Overview
Kenmore East is located in the Town of Tonawanda, New York, a suburb of Buffalo. It is one of three high schools within the Ken-Ton School District. Mr. Trevor Brown is the current Principal, while Joseph Greco and Shawn Siddall are Assistant Principals, and Nathan Bourke is the schools Athletics Coordinator.

Athletics
Kenmore East features three different competitive levels of play - junior varsity, varsity, and club sports. Some sports have been combined with Kenmore West to form one unified Kenmore Team, the most notable being the Girls Swim Team's Niagara Frontier League Championship winning streak and the Girls Hockey state championship in 2013.
Baseball
Basketball (Girls & Boys)
Bowling
Cheerleading
Cross Country
Field Hockey
Football
Golf
Gymnastics
Hockey (Girls & Boys)
Lacrosse (Girls & Boys)
Rifle
Rugby (Girls & Boys)
Soccer (Girls & Boys)
Softball
Swimming (Girls & Boys)
Tennis (Girls & Boys)
Track (Girls & Boys)
Volleyball (Girls & Boys)
Wrestling

Notable alumni
Keith Franke/Adrian Adonis (former undisputed world wrestling champion)
Cal Kern, owner of the Niagara Power
Jon L. Luther CEO of Dunkin Brands  as well as the chairman of Wingstop and many others
Billy Sheehan, rock bass guitar player (Talas, David Lee Roth Band, Mr. Big)
James Oberg (1962), author and Soviet space expert
Paul Vogt, actor and comedian
Jeff Glor, CBS News anchor

See also
Kenmore-Town of Tonawanda School District

References

External links
Kenmore East High School Website

Public high schools in New York (state)
High schools in Erie County, New York
1959 establishments in New York (state)
Educational institutions established in 1959